is a passenger railway station in the city of Sakura, Chiba Prefecture, Japan, operated by the private railway operator Keisei Electric Railway.

Lines
Ōsakura Station is served by the Keisei Main Line, and lies 53.0 kilometers from the Tokyo terminus of the line at Keisei-Ueno Station.

Station layout
The station consists of two opposed side platforms connected by a level crossing.

Platforms

History
Ōsakura Station opened on 9 December 1926.

Station numbering was introduced to all Keisei Line stations on 17 July 2010. Ōsakura Station was assigned station number KS36.

Passenger statistics
In fiscal 2019, the station was used by an average of 402 passengers daily.

Surrounding area
 Sakura City Sakurahigashi Elementary School
 Shisui Municipal Shisui Elementary School

See also
 List of railway stations in Japan

References

External links

 Keisei Station layout 

Railway stations in Chiba Prefecture
Keisei Main Line
Railway stations in Japan opened in 1926
Sakura, Chiba